South Central Avenue Historic District is a national historic district in Baltimore, Maryland, United States. It contains brick two- and three-story industrial and residential buildings reflecting over 150 years of utilitarian adaptation of buildings and space.   The district includes early 19th century rowhouses, late 19th century and early 20th century manufacturing and warehouse buildings, gas stations, stables, car barns, commercial/residential buildings, and corner stores. Several larger buildings are the Bagby Furniture Company Building (4 stories), the Strauss Malt House (5 stories), and the Alameda School. Many rowhouses have been covered with formstone.

It was added to the National Register of Historic Places in 2001.

References

External links
, including photo dated 2001, at Maryland Historical Trust
Boundary Map of the South Central Avenue Historic District, Baltimore City, at Maryland Historical Trust

Historic districts on the National Register of Historic Places in Baltimore
Georgian architecture in Maryland
Victorian architecture in Maryland